Halashi (Halasi) is a historical village in Belgaum district in the southern state of Karnataka, India.

Halashi was ruled by the Kadamba dynasty and was said to have 100 temples. The famous temples are Sri Lakshmi Narasimha, Kalmeswara, Suverneshwara. Ram Theertha and Vyasa Theertha group of temples near the village. The village has a famous Jain Basadi too. The village is surrounded by vegetation and mountains.

References

halashi halashi.weebly.com

Villages in Belagavi district